Martin Drummond Vesey Holt (13 January 1881 – 2 November 1956) was a British fencer. He won two silver medals in the team épée competitions at the 1908 and 1912 Summer Olympics. In 1920 and 1923, he won the épée title at the British Fencing Championships.

See also
 List of athletes with the most appearances at Olympic Games

References

1881 births
1956 deaths
British male fencers
Olympic fencers of Great Britain
Fencers at the 1908 Summer Olympics
Fencers at the 1912 Summer Olympics
Fencers at the 1920 Summer Olympics
Fencers at the 1924 Summer Olympics
Fencers at the 1928 Summer Olympics
Olympic silver medallists for Great Britain
Olympic medalists in fencing
Sportspeople from London
Medalists at the 1908 Summer Olympics
Medalists at the 1912 Summer Olympics
20th-century British people